The 1993 CONCACAF Cup Winners Cup was the second edition of the CONCACAF Cup Winners Cup. Mexican side C.F. Monterrey won the tournament as winner of the Final stage played at Monterey Park, California from 28 July to 1 August.

Preliminary round

North American Zone

Central American Zone

 Luis Ángel Firpo received a bye.

Caribbean Zone

First round

* Played over one leg only.

Second round

* Yobbo Rangers withdrew before 1st leg.

Third round

Northern/Caribbean play-off

Final round

Champion

References

2
CONCACAF Cup Winners Cup
1993